Michael Häupl (born 14 September 1949) is an Austrian politician. A member of the Social Democratic Party of Austria, he served as mayor and governor of Vienna from 7 November 1994 until 24 May 2018.

Early life and education
Häupl was born in Altlengbach, Lower Austria. He studied Biology and Zoology at the University of Vienna and was an academic assistant at the Vienna Natural History Museum from 1975 to 1983.

Political career
He was the State Chairman of the Socialist Students of Austria, the student organisation of the SPÖ from 1975 to 1978, a member of the Viennese Municipal Council from 1983 to 1988, and from 1988 until 1994, Executive City Councillor for Environment and Sport. Häupl followed Helmut Zilk in 1993 as a state party chairman of the SPÖ in Vienna and on 7 November 1994, he became the mayor of Vienna.

Häupl has won three elections since his appointment as mayor; each of them has led to increased majorities for the SPÖ. In the 1996 City Council election, the SPÖ lost its overall control of the 100-seat chamber with 43 seats on 39.15% of the vote. 1996 also saw a strong FPÖ, which won 29 seats (up from 21 in 1991), beating the ÖVP into third place for the second time running. For the period 1996-2001 the SPÖ governed Vienna in a coalition with the ÖVP.

In 2001 the SPÖ regained overall control with 52 seats on 46.91% of the vote; it improved on this in October 2005 with 55 seats on 49.09%. However, Häupl has also presided over a period of increased voter apathy, with turnout dropping from 68.46% in 1996 to 60.81% in 2005.

Häupl is the Deputy Federal Party chairman of the SPÖ and was considered to be one of the most important internal supporters of the former chairman, Werner Faymann.

On 14 December 2004 Häupl was elected unopposed to succeed Valéry Giscard d'Estaing as President of the Council of European Municipalities and Regions.

Häupl was awarded the Czech Order of the White Lion in October 2017 along with Gerhard Schröder and Borut Pahor.

References

External links 
 
 CityMayors profile

1949 births
Living people
Mayors of Vienna
People from Sankt Pölten-Land District
Social Democratic Party of Austria politicians
University of Vienna alumni
Recipients of the Order of the White Lion